Iron Mind are a hardcore punk band from Melbourne, Australia that began in 2006, originally under the name of 'Hold Up'. The band takes influence from the NYHC sound and are notable for being one of the most popular bands of the hardcore genre in Australia. The band is currently signed to Resist Records.

History 

Iron Mind toured Australia in 2012 in support of their album, Hell Split Open, alongside Backtrack and Terror. They followed with shows in New Zealand in October.

Their second album, Iron Mind, was produced by Mike Deslandes (Blkout, Robotosaurus, Coerce) in the Dandenong Ranges; it was released in mid-January 2014 via Resist Records. Mark Hebblewhite of The Music felt "this is very angry music. Each of the album's ten tracks seethes with an unrelenting rage channeled into an epic avalanche of molten mid-tempo riffage... [they] have probably dropped the hardcore album of 2014." The album reached No. 15 on the ARIA Hitseekers – Albums Chart.

Discography

Studio Releases

Releases as 'Hold Up'

Members

Current

Sam Octigan - Vocals
Neil Bloem - Guitar
David Gatica - Guitar
Daniel Collins - Bass
Josh Barclay - Drums

Former

Daniel "Tbone" Peters - Guitar
Jack Sparrow - Bass
Brenton Lee - Bass

References

External links 

 Iron Mind at Facebook

Australian hardcore punk groups
Crossover thrash groups